"Goona-goona epic" refers to a particular type of native-culture exploitation film set in remote parts of the Far East, Southeast Asia, Africa, South America, and the South Pacific. These include documentaries (often of questionable authenticity) and dramas, both of which rely heavily on travelogue and stock footage scenes (and sometimes fabricated scenes) of semi-nude native peoples performing exotic rituals and customs.

In Hollywood trade magazines "goona-goona" was a descriptive word for films or photos showing women of color with bare breasts, usually in a supposed spirit of ethnographic interest like National Geographic.

The word goona-goona comes from the 1932 film Goona-Goona, An Authentic Melodrama of the Island of Bali by Andre Roosevelt and Armand Denis. Supposedly "goona-goona" is an aphrodisiac or "love powder" made from a narcotic plant. In Indonesian, the word actually means a type of evil magic or a love spell cast upon an unwilling victim.

Films

See also
Nudity in film

References

Film genres